Freudenberg can refer to:

Companies
 Freudenberg Group, a German family-owned diversified group of companies
 Freudenberg IT, a German company

Places

France
 Freudenberg, Moselle, a village in the French département of Moselle

Germany
 Schloss Freudenberg, a palace in Wiesbaden-Dotzheim
 Beiersdorf-Freudenberg
 Freudenberg, Bavaria, in the Amberg-Sulzbach district, Bavaria
 Freudenberg, Westphalia, in the Siegen-Wittgenstein district, North Rhine-Westphalia
 Freudenberg (Baden), in the Main-Tauber district, Baden-Württemberg

Switzerland
 Freudenberg Castle

People
 Freudenberg (surname)

See also
 Hubertus, Prince of Löwenstein-Wertheim-Freudenberg (1906–1984), German historian and an early opponent of Adolf Hitler